Robert Malcolm ("Bob", "Two Bud") Schmidt (born July 9, 1936) is a former American football player.  Schmidt played college football at the University of Minnesota and professionally between 1959 and 1967.  He started with the National Football League's New York Giants and then moved to the new American Football League's Houston Oilers in 1961.  He was a member of the Oilers' American Football League Championship team in 1961, and was an AFL All-Star in 1961, 1962, and 1963.  He finished his professional football career in 1967 with the AFL's Buffalo Bills.

Schmidt now lives in the Buffalo suburb of Hamburg, New York, with his lovely wife Mary Margaret Schmidt (married December 8, 1994 in Rochester, NY).

See also
 List of American Football League players

References

1936 births
Living people
American football centers
American football offensive guards
American football offensive tackles
Houston Oilers players
Boston Patriots players
Buffalo Bills players
Minnesota Golden Gophers football players
New York Giants players
American Football League All-Star players
Sportspeople from Rochester, Minnesota
Players of American football from Minnesota
American Football League players